The Yitzhak Sadeh Prize for Military Literature is an annual award  literary award given in Israel for the finest book on a military topic. It is named in honor of Yitzhak Sadeh.

Winners
 1976, The Emissary: The Life of Enzo Seren by Ruth Bondy
 1980, In the Days of Destruction and Revolt by Zivia Lubetkin
 1984, To an Independent Jewish Army: The United Kibbutz in the Haganah 1939–1949 by Uri Brenner
 1991, Platoon Commander's Pin by Yigal Shefi
 1993, The Resistance Boats: Illegal Immigration 1945–1948 by Nahum Bogner
 1995, First Signs of Armor by Amiad Brezner
 1998, Points of Strength: Settlement Policy in Order to Achieve Political and Security Goals Before the State and in Its Beginning by Osnat Shiran
 2002, Adjusting Sights by Haim Sabato
 2006, Beaufort, by Ron Leshem
 2018, War Lives, by Nitza Ben-Dov

References

Military literary awards
Hebrew literary awards
Israeli literary awards
Awards established in 1972